The 2019 Florida State Seminoles baseball team represented Florida State University during the 2019 NCAA Division I baseball season. The Seminoles played their home games at Mike Martin Field at Dick Howser Stadium as a member of the Atlantic Coast Conference. They were led by head coach Mike Martin, in his 40th and final season at Florida State.

Roster

Schedule

2019 MLB draft

References

Florida State Seminoles
Florida State Seminoles baseball seasons
Florida State baseball
Florida State
College World Series seasons